Robert E. Lee Day  is a state holiday in parts of the Southern US, commemorating the Confederate general Robert E. Lee.

January 19 was marked by the governor of Tennessee as Robert E. Lee Day in 2013.

Texas made "Lee Day" a holiday in 1931. In 1973, "Lee Day" was renamed Confederate Heroes Day.

Florida Statute 683.01(d) marks January 19 as Robert E. Lee Day, although no offices or schools close down for it.

Alabama and Mississippi observe it on the third Monday in January, in order to split the date with the federal holiday Martin Luther King Jr. Day.

Arkansas combined the observance of Robert E. Lee Day with Martin Luther King, Jr. Day in 1985, after two years of requiring state employees to select between the two holidays or their own birthday as a day off from work. In 2017, it passed a law removing General Lee's name from the January holiday and instead establishing a state memorial day on the second Saturday of October in honor of Lee. In 2000 Virginia experimented with splitting Lee–Jackson–King Day into a separate Lee–Jackson Day on the Friday before Martin Luther King Jr. Day, dropping the former in 2020. Georgia formerly called the Friday after Thanksgiving Robert E. Lee Day; now it is only an unnamed paid holiday.

See also
 List of memorials to Robert E. Lee

References

Further reading
 

Alabama state holidays
Annual events in the United States
Arkansas state holidays
Florida state holidays
Holidays related to the American Civil War
January observances
Mississippi state holidays
Monuments and memorials to Robert E. Lee